Valentina Vyacheslavovna Azarova, also Valentina Miron (born 1991) is a Russian athlete performing in fitness, bodybuilding, and Brazilian jiu-jitsu, in which she holds a purple belt. She was the 2017 European Jiu-Jitsu Champion in the women's blue belt featherweight division (No Gi) in the International Brazilian Jiu-Jitsu Federation.

Before she became an athlete, she was a former adult film actress (under the name Megan Vale and Lupe Burnett).

References

External links
 Валентина Азарова: о том, как стать девушкой фитнес бикини

1991 births
Living people
Russian jujutsuka
Russian practitioners of Brazilian jiu-jitsu
Russian sambo practitioners
Russian female bodybuilders
Russian female mixed martial artists
Mixed martial artists utilizing sambo
Mixed martial artists utilizing Brazilian jiu-jitsu
Lesgaft National State University of Physical Education, Sport and Health alumni
Russian pornographic film actresses
Sportspeople from Saint Petersburg
Actresses from Saint Petersburg